Halictus farinosus is a species of ground-nesting sweat bee in the family Halictidae. The species is a primitively eusocial bee, of intermediate social strength when compared to other social species in the genus Halictus.

References

Further reading

External links

 

farinosus
Articles created by Qbugbot
Insects described in 1853